Hamza Tahir (born 9 November 1995) is a Scottish cricketer. He made his Twenty20 International (T20I) debut for Scotland against Pakistan on 12 June 2018. He made his List A debut for Scotland against Oman on 20 February 2019, following the 2018–19 Oman Quadrangular Series.

In June 2019, he was selected to represent Scotland A in their tour to Ireland to play the Ireland Wolves. The next month, he was selected to play for the Glasgow Giants in the inaugural edition of the Euro T20 Slam cricket tournament. However, the following month the tournament was cancelled.

In July 2019, he was named in Scotland's One Day International (ODI) squad for the 2019 Scotland Tri-Nation Series. He made his ODI debut for Scotland, against Papua New Guinea, on 17 August 2019. In his next match, against Oman, he took his first five-wicket haul in ODI cricket.

In September 2019, he was named in Scotland's squad for the 2019 ICC T20 World Cup Qualifier tournament in the United Arab Emirates. In September 2021, Tahir was named in Scotland's provisional squad for the 2021 ICC Men's T20 World Cup.

References

External links
 

1995 births
Living people
Scottish cricketers
Scotland One Day International cricketers
Scotland Twenty20 International cricketers
Sportspeople from Paisley, Renfrewshire
British Asian cricketers